Le Val-d'Ajol is a commune in the Vosges department in Grand Est in northeastern France. The Jesuit priest and singer Aimé Duval (1918–1984) was born in Le Val-d'Ajol.

See also
Communes of the Vosges department
De Buyer

References

External links

Official site

Communes of Vosges (department)